Tsergo Ri (also knows as Tserko Ri) is a mountain peak located in Langtang National Park, Bagmati Province of Nepal.

Location 

Accessibility 
Tsergo Ri Peak can be climbed from Kyanjin Gompa, the ascend takes up to 6-7 hours and up to 3-4 hours to descend, it's considered a challengeable trek due to the strong wind and the time consumed to reach the top, as well as the rough trail which can be fully covered with snow in winter and no access to drinking water.

From the top of Tsergo Ri, trekkers can see a panoramic view of the Langtang mountain range and Shishapangma mountain.

Trekking to Tsergo Ri requires no special permit, only the Langtang national park ticket which can be bought from outside the park for 3000 NPR (for foreigners).

See also 

 Tsergo Ri landslide

References 

Mountains of Nepal
Five-thousanders of the Himalayas